Tim Chambers may refer to:

 Timothy Chambers, philosopher
 Tim Chambers (baseball) (1965–2019), American college baseball coach
 Staff Sgt. Tim Chambers, better known as "The Saluting Marine"